Supergalaxy, super-galaxy, or super galaxy may refer to:

Astronomy
 a term for the Virgo Cluster of galaxies and its outlying members
 a reference to the organization of the supergalactic coordinates system
 Brightest cluster galaxy
 a giant galaxy (i.e. giant elliptical, gE, cD, D), see galaxy
 a system of a central galaxy, and satellite galaxies

Games and storylines
 Super Galaxy Invader and Super Galaxy Invasion, a handheld videogame by Bandai
 Super Galaxy, a handheld clone videogame of Asteroids (video game)
 Super Galaxy, an Ultraman storyline
 Super Galaxy, a mecha (Mega) from Power Rangers and Sentai Rangers
 Legend of the Super Galaxy, part of Cyborg 009

Other uses
 C-5M Super Galaxy, a military cargo transport aircraft
 Super Galaxy, a bicycle manufactured by Dawes Cycles